Cherokee County is located in the US state of Georgia. As of the 2020 Census, the population was 266,620. The county seat is Canton. The county Board of Commissioners is the governing body, with members elected to office. Cherokee County is included in the Atlanta Metropolitan Area.

History

Original territory

Originally, Cherokee County was more like a territory than a county, covering lands northwest of the Chattahoochee River and Chestatee River except for Carroll County. This county was created December 26, 1831, by the state legislature.  It was named after the Cherokee people who lived in the area at that time. Several other counties were carved out of these Cherokee lands as part of the Cherokee Land Lottery of 1832.

An act of the Georgia General Assembly passed on December 3 of that year created the counties of Forsyth, Lumpkin, Union, Cobb, Gilmer, Murray, Cass (now Bartow), Floyd, and Paulding. The forcible removal of the Cherokee people, leading up to the notorious Trail of Tears to Indian Territory west of the Mississippi River, began a year prior. The push by European Americans to expel the Cherokee was accelerated by the discovery of gold in local streams.

County courts were authorized to meet at the home of Ambrose Harnage. The settlement soon became known as Harnageville when Cherokee County was first established.  Since 1880, that town has been renamed to Tate and is located in Pickens County. 

Etowah was declared the county seat in 1833. Its name was later changed to Canton, which is still the county seat today.

Remaining county
In 1857, part of the southeastern corner of the county was ceded by the General Assembly to form Milton County (now the city of Milton in the county of Fulton). In the 1890s, The Atlanta & Knoxville Railroad (later renamed the Marietta & North Georgia Railroad when it could not be completed to Knoxville) built a branch line through the middle of the county.  When this line was bought by the Louisville & Nashville Railroad the following decade, the L&N Railroad built stations at Woodstock and other towns.

Development
It is bisected by Interstate 575, which runs from Marietta north through Woodstock, Lebanon, Holly Springs, Canton, and Ball Ground. Interstate 575 is currently undergoing expansion in Cherokee County.

The Georgia Northeastern Railroad operates freight service on the former L&N tracks, roughly parallel to this route. Population growth has followed the same general pattern, as well, with new suburbs in the south following the highway toward exurbs further north.

2021 Atlanta spa shootings
In 2021, four people were killed and a fifth person was wounded in a mass shooting at Young's Asian Massage, a massage parlor in unincorporated Cherokee County. The shooting was the first of a series of mass shootings targeting massage parlors in the Atlanta metropolitan area, which left a total of eight people dead. A suspect was apprehended in connection to the incidents.

Geography
Much of the water is in Lake Allatoona in the southwest. The lake is fed by the Etowah and Little Rivers (the county's primary waterways), and other large streams such as Noonday Creek. Much of the northern part of the county begins to rise toward the foothills.

The vast majority of Cherokee County is located in the [Etowah River] subbasin of the Coosa-Tallapoosa River Basin, with only a small northwesterly corner of the county located in the Coosawattee River subbasin of the same basin.

Mountains

Nine summits are listed by the United States Geological Survey Geographic Names Information System as being in the county.  From tallest to lowest, they are:

 Bear Mountain – 
 Pine Log Mountain – 
 Oakey Mountain – 
 Dry Pond Mountain – 
 Hickory Log Mountain – 
 Polecat Mountain – 
 Byrd Mountain – 
 Garland Mountain – 
 Posey Mountain –

Adjacent counties
 Pickens – north
 Dawson – northeast
 Forsyth – east
 Fulton – southeast
 Cobb – south
 Bartow – west
 Gordon – northwest

Government, politics, and policing

Government
The five-member board of commissioners is elected from four districts, with an at-large county commission chair. Thus, members are elected as residents of geographic districts, but the commission chair must receive the majority vote of the county in total. Each is elected to a four-year term.

Cherokee County sheriff and municipal police
The county is under the jurisdiction of the Cherokee County Sheriff's Office, which is headed by Sheriff Frank Reynolds. The Cherokee County Sheriff's office is triple crown accredited by CALEA, ACA, and NCCHC. The major cities within the county have individual municipal police departments, such as Woodstock, Canton, Holly Springs, and Ball Ground.

Politics
As of 2021, all state, county, and municipal elected officials representing Cherokee County are members of the Republican Party (with the exception of officials who hold officially non-partisan offices).

Cherokee County had voting patterns similar to most Solid South and Georgia counties prior to 1964 in presidential elections, though Democratic Party candidates did not win by as wide margins as they did in the rest of the state and the Deep South. In fact, the county backed Republican candidates four times between 1900 and 1960. From 1964 on, the county has swung strongly toward the Republicans, only failing to vote for the Republican in presidential elections since then in 1968 when segregationist George Wallace appealed to anti-Civil Rights Act sentiment and in the two elections Georgian Jimmy Carter was on the ballot. In addition, unlike the inner suburban counties of the Atlanta metropolitan area, Cherokee County has continued to vote for Republicans by landslide margins, although the margins have decreased slightly in the most recent elections with the growth of the metropolitan area. In the Presidential election of 2020, the majority of votes from all of the 42 county election precincts were cast for incumbent President Donald Trump.

Demographics

2020 census

As of the 2020 United States census, there were 266,620 people, 93,441 households, and 69,257 families residing in the county.

2010 census
As of the 2010 United States Census, 214,346 people, 75,936 households, and 57,876 families were living in the county. The 82,360 housing units averaged . The racial makeup of the county was 86.6% White, 5.65% Black or African American, 1.65% Asian, 0.4% American Indian, 0.1% Pacific Islander, 3.6% from other races, and 2.1% from two or more races. Those of Hispanic or Latino origin of any race made up 9.6% of the population. In terms of ancestry, 16.2% were Irish, 16.1% were German, 14.1% were English, 10.7% were American, and 5.7% were Italian.

Of the 75,936 households, 41.4% had children under the age of 18 living with them, 61.9% were married couples living together, 10.1% had a female householder with no husband present, 23.8% were not families, and 18.8% of all households were made up of individuals. The average household size was 2.80 and the average family size was 3.20. The median age was 36.3 years.

The median income for a household in the county was $66,320 and for a family was $77,190. Males had a median income of $53,773 versus $40,153 for females. The per capita income for the county was $30,217. About 5.5% of families and 7.4% of the population were below the poverty line, including 8.4% of those under age 18 and 7.7% of those age 65 or over.

2000 census
As of the census of 2000, 141,903 people, 49,495 households, and 39,200 families resided in the county.

Of the 49,495 households, 41.40% had children under the age of 18 living with them, 67.20% were married couples living together, 8.30% had a female householder with no husband present, and 20.80% were not families. About 16.00% of all households were made up of individuals, and 4.10% had someone living alone who was 65 years of age or older. The average household size was 2.85 and the average family size was 3.18.

In the county, the population was distributed as 28.30% under the age of 18, 7.70% from 18 to 24, 35.80% from 25 to 44, 21.70% from 45 to 64, and 6.60% who were 65 years of age or older. The median age was 34 years. For every 100 females, there were 100.70 males. For every 100 females age 18 and over, there were 98.90 males.

The median income for a household in the county was $60,896, and for a family was $66,419. Males had a median income of $44,374 versus $31,036 for females. The per capita income for the county was $24,871. About 3.50% of families and 5.30% of the population were below the poverty line, including 5.50% of those under age 18 and 9.80% of those age 65 or over.

Education

Public schools
 Cherokee County School District (40 Schools)
 Cherokee Charter Academy (CSUSA)

Private schools
Private schools in Cherokee County include:
 Lyndon Academy (Holly Springs)
 Cherokee Christian Schools (Woodstock)
 Cherokee Christian Academy (Woodstock)
 Community Christian School (Canton)
 Crossroads Christian School (Canton)
 Omega Learning Academy (Woodstock)
 The King's Academy (Woodstock)

Higher education
 Reinhardt University is a private, co-educational liberal arts college located in Waleska, Georgia.

Chattahoochee Technical College has campuses in Woodstock and Canton in Cherokee County.

Transportation

Major highways

  Interstate 75
  Interstate 575
  State Route 5
  State Route 5 Business (Canton)
  State Route 5 Business (Ball Ground)
  State Route 20
  State Route 92
  State Route 108
  State Route 140
  State Route 369
  State Route 372
  State Route 401 (unsigned designation for I-75)
  State Route 417 (unsigned designation for I-575)

Airport
The Cherokee County Airport (FAA LOC ID: CNI) is located adjacent to I-575 about six miles (10 km) northeast of downtown Canton.

The new facilities will accommodate 200 corporate aircraft in hangars and provide 100 tie-downs for smaller aircraft.

Public transportation
The Cherokee Area Transit Service serves all of the Cherokee County area, rural and suburban.

Pedestrians and cycling

 Noonday Creek Trail
 Serenade Trail
 Trestle Rock Trail

Communities

Cities

 Ball Ground
 Canton (county seat)
 Holly Springs
 Mountain Park
 Nelson
 Waleska
 Woodstock

Unincorporated communities

 Batesville
 Buffington
 Free Home
 Gold Ridge
 Hickory Flat
 Keithsburg
 Lake Arrowhead
 Lebanon
 Toonigh (neighborhood of Holly Springs)
 Macedonia
 Mica
 Oak Grove
 Orange
 Salacoa
 Sixes
 Sutallee
 Towne Lake
 Univeter
 Victoria

Notable residents
 Joseph E. Brown was elected governor of Georgia in 1857 and later served as U.S. Senator from Georgia. Brown's primary residence and law practice were in Canton, and he owned a farm believed to be near the Sutallee community.
 Ira Roe Foster was Quartermaster General of Georgia, a brigadier general in the Georgia Militia (1845), attorney, medical doctor, Cherokee County State Representative, first mayor of Eastman, Georgia, and Alabama state senator. 
 Josh Holloway, actor and model, is most famous for his role as James "Sawyer" Ford on Lost. He attended Free Home Elementary in Free Home and Cherokee High School in Canton.
 Johnny Hunt was president of the Southern Baptist Convention in 2008–2010.
 Chris Kirk, a PGA Tour golfer, attended Etowah High School.
 Nick Markakis, MLB outfielder for the Atlanta Braves, attended Woodstock High School.
 Bruce Miller, NFL fullback, formerly played for the San Francisco 49ers, attended Woodstock High School.
 Robert Rechsteiner, better known as Rick Steiner, ex-professional wrestler, is now a part of the school board for the county.  He also sells homes in the county as a real estate agent.
 Blair Redford, an actor best known for his roles as Scotty Grainger on The Young and the Restless and Miguel Lopez-Fitzgerald on Passions, grew up in Canton.

 Dean Rusk, U.S. Secretary of State, was born in Cherokee County. Dean Rusk Middle School was named after him.
 Buster Skrine, NFL cornerback for the New York Jets, attended Etowah High School.
 Drew Waters, professional baseball player for the Atlanta Braves, attended Etowah High School.

See also

 National Register of Historic Places listings in Cherokee County, Georgia
List of counties in Georgia

References

External links
 Cherokee County government
 Cherokee County School District
 Cherokee County Airport – FAA Airport Master Record
 Cherokee County historical marker

Local newspapers
 TheCherokeeConnection.com – Cherokee County Ga News, Events, & Community Publication
 The Cherokee Ledger-News
 HomeTownCherokee.com – Cherokee's Online News & Community Publication
 Cherokee Tribune
 Cherokee Today

 
1831 establishments in Georgia (U.S. state)
Populated places established in 1831
Georgia placenames of Native American origin
Georgia (U.S. state) counties
Cherokee
Counties of Appalachia